Union High School is a comprehensive community public high school located in Union Township, in Union County, New Jersey, United States, serving students in ninth through twelfth grades as the lone secondary school of the Union Public School District. In the late 1960s, a new high school was built, expanding on the existing Burnet Junior High School structure. Subsequent to completion of the new Union High School, the former high school building became Burnet Junior High and later, Burnet Middle School. The school has been accredited by the Middle States Association of Colleges and Schools Commission on Elementary and Secondary Schools since 1953.

As of the 2021–22 school year, the school had an enrollment of 2,270 students and 169.0 classroom teachers (on an FTE basis), for a student–teacher ratio of 13.4:1. There were 687 students (30.3% of enrollment) eligible for free lunch and 239 (10.5% of students) eligible for reduced-cost lunch.

Awards, recognition and rankings
The school was the 201st-ranked public high school in New Jersey out of 339 schools statewide in New Jersey Monthly magazine's September 2014 cover story on the state's "Top Public High Schools", using a new ranking methodology. The school had been ranked 250th in the state of 328 schools in 2012, after being ranked 243rd in 2010 out of 322 schools listed. The magazine ranked the school 229th in 2008 out of 316 schools. The school was ranked 210th in the magazine's September 2006 issue, which surveyed 316 schools across the state.

Union High School Performing Arts Company 
The Union High School Performing Arts Company (UHSPAC) includes a theatre department, an instrumental music program, and various choral music groups.

Musicals
Union High School's theatre department, under the direction of James Mosser, produces two major theatrical productions annually and has been recognized numerous times by the Paper Mill Playhouse in their annual Rising Star Awards. In 2010, the UHSPAC's production of Joseph and the Amazing Technicolor Dreamcoat received the Rising Star Award for Best Overall Production, Best Director, Best Music Direction and Best Chorus; winning more awards than any other school in the state. UHSPAC's 2013 production of Cats was nominated for 14 Rising Star Awards and won five, the second-most of any school in the state, including awards for Outstanding Chorus, Outstanding Choreography/Musical Staging, and Outstanding Orchestra. Also in 2015, the UHSPAC production of "Sophisticated Ladies" was nominated for 16 Rising Star Awards, winning nine of them, the most in the 20-year history of the Rising Star Awards. Of those nine included: Outstanding Overall Production of a Musical, Outstanding Performance in a Featured Role, Outstanding Musical Direction. The UHSPAC came home with more awards than any other school in the state. In 2018 their production of Peter Pan won best musical at the Paper Mill Playhouse Rising star Awards, making their third best musical win.

Marching Band
The Union High School Marching Band consists of wind, percussion, and color guard members. The band performs at all school football games and competes in many USBands and Tournament of Bands (TOB) competitions located in the New York/New Jersey/Pennsylvania area. At the 2012 Yamaha Cup, with their show entitled, "Rosie", the marching band won 1st place in Group 4A competition with a score of 85.888 and receiving the awards for Best Music, Best Visual, and Best Overall Effect, competing against 13 other marching bands in that division. In 2014 with their show entitled, "Soaring", the marching band won 1st place in the USBANDS Group 3A New Jersey state championship at Rutgers University with a score of 84.400 and receiving the award for Best Overall Effect, beating out 18 other New Jersey bands competing within Group 3A. Also in 2014, the band won 1st place at the USBands Group 3A National Championships in Allentown, Pennsylvania at J. Birney Crum Stadium. They achieved a score of 91.213, taking home the awards for Best Guard, Best Music, and Best Visual and they defeated 15 other bands in the 3A division.

Athletics 
The Union High School Farmers compete in the Union County Interscholastic Athletic Conference, which is comprised of public and private high schools in Union County and was established following a reorganization of sports leagues in Northern New Jersey by the New Jersey State Interscholastic Athletic Association (NJSIAA). Prior to the NJSIAA's 2010 realignment, the school had participated in the Watchung Conference, a high school sports association which included public high schools in Essex, Hudson and Union counties. With 1,618 students in grades 10–12, the school was classified by the NJSIAA for the 2019–20 school year as Group IV for most athletic competition purposes, which included schools with an enrollment of 1,060 to 5,049 students in that grade range. The football team competes in Division 5A of the Big Central Football Conference, which includes 60 public and private high schools in Hunterdon, Middlesex, Somerset, Union and Warren counties, which are broken down into 10 divisions by size and location. The school was classified by the NJSIAA as Group V North for football for 2018–2020.

Together with David Brearley High School, the school participates in a cooperative ice hockey program with Jonathan Dayton High School as the host school / lead agency, under an agreement scheduled to expire at the end of the 2023–24 school year.

The boys spring / outdoor track team won the Group III state championship in 1930 and 1931, won the Group II title in 1933, and won in Group IV in 1973.

The boys' cross country team won the overall Public B title in 1931 and the overall state championship in 1943.

The boys tennis team won the overall state championship in 1959 (against runner-up Teaneck High School in the final match of the tournament) and 1960 (vs. Ridgewood High School). The 1959 team won the state title after defeating previously undefeated River Dell Regional High School 3-0 in the quarterfinals and Ridgewood High School 2-1 in the semis before knocking off Teaneck 2-1 in the final round of the tournament.

The boys' bowling team won the overall state championship in 1966, 1968 and 1986. The program's three state titles are tied for seventh-most in the state.

The baseball team won the Group IV state championship in 1972 (vs. Ewing High School), 1974 (vs. Sayreville High School) and 2002 (vs. Jackson Memorial High School).

The boys track team won the winter track Meet of Champions in 1973.

The football team won the North II Group IV state sectional championships in 1978, 1979, 1982, 1984–1987 and 1991–1993, and won the North II Group V title in 2019. In the 1979 North II Group IV final, the team won the championship with a 35-24 victory against a Livingston High School team led by quarterback Stan Yagiello at Giants Stadium in front of 15,000 fans  The 1991 team came back from a 14-0 at the half to defeat Randolph High School by a score of 24-14 in the North II Group IV championship game, to end Randolph's 59-game unbeaten streak, which was the longest at the time in state history. The 1992 team, ranked fifth in the nation by USA Today, finished the season with an 11-0 record and extended their winning streak to 22 games after taking the North Group IV state sectional title with a 21-7 victory against Randolph High School in the championship game played in front of 7,000 fans. In 1993, the team beat Randolph 19-6 to win the North II Group IV sectional championship and finish the season 10-1. In 2019, the team won the North II Group V sectional title, the program's first in more than a quarter century, with a 42–28 win against Clifton High School in the championship game. The school's rivalry with Linden High School, with games played on Thanksgiving Day (or the day before Thanksgiving) for more than 75 years, was listed at 13th on NJ.com's 2017 list "Ranking the 31 fiercest rivalries in N.J. HS football". Union leads the rivalry with a 37–32–5 overall record as of 2017.

The softball team won the Group IV state title in 1989, defeating Middletown High School North by a score of 3-1 in the championship game. The team won the North II Group IV state championship in 2009 and were the runner-ups in the Group IV final game against Williamstown High School.

The boys' basketball team won the Group IV state championship in 1997, coming back from being down 10 points in the fourth quarter to defeat Atlantic City High School by a score of 61-50 in the tournament final played at Boardwalk Hall.

On May 2, 2008, the school's Armed Drill Team took first place at The Nationals in the challenger level.

Administration
The school's interim principal Althea Bossard. Her core administration team includes four vice principals.

Notable alumni

 Peter J. Biondi (1942-2011), politician who served in the New Jersey General Assembly from 1998 until his death in 2011, where he represented the 16th Legislative District.
 Nija Charles (born 1997, class of 2015), 3x Grammy Award winning songwriter and record producer.
 Isa Abdul-Quddus (born 1989), NFL football player for the New Orleans Saints.
 Aminat Ayinde (Class of 2004), contestant on Cycle 12 of America's Next Top Model.
 Dave D'Addio (born 1961), former running back for the Detroit Lions.
 Larry Kubin (born 1959, class of 1977), former NFL linebacker who played with the Washington Redskins, Buffalo Bills and Tampa Bay Buccaneers.
 Artie Lange (born 1967), comedian and mainstay of The Howard Stern Show.
 Ray Liotta (1954-2022), actor who appeared in such films as Goodfellas, Field of Dreams and Narc.
 Elliott Maddox (born 1947), major league baseball outfielder.
 Eulace Peacock (1914–1996, class of 1933), track and field athlete in the 1930s who bested Jesse Owens at several meets but never made it to the 1936 Summer Olympics due to an injury.
 Sylvia Pogorzelski (born 1985), Miss New Jersey USA 2005.
 Philip Rubin (born 1949, class of 1967), CEO emeritus of Haskins Laboratories and a White House science adviser.
 Al Santorini (born 1948), major league baseball pitcher who played for the Atlanta Braves, San Diego Padres and St. Louis Cardinals.
 Amy Simon (born 1971), planetary scientist at NASA's Goddard Space Flight Center.
 Darnell Stapleton (born 1985), offensive guard for the Pittsburgh Steelers.
 Travis Taylor (born 1990), professional basketball player.
 Robert Wuhl (born 1951), star of the HBO series Arliss, stand up comedian, and supporting actor in the original Batman movie directed by Tim Burton.
 Darren Young (born 1979), professional wrestler.

References

External links

Union High school web page
Union High School Performing Arts Company web page
Union High School

School Data for the Union Public School District, National Center for Education Statistics

Middle States Commission on Secondary Schools
Public high schools in Union County, New Jersey
Union Township, Union County, New Jersey